Witheridge Football Club is a football club based in the Devon village of Witheridge.

History
Witheridge have come a long way since the days of the Married team and Singles team. Up until the Second World War, Witheridge played their football in the North Devon League. After the war Witheridge didn't rejoin the North Devon League but joined the Tiverton and District league, playing clubs like Bampton and Elmore.
In 1971, Witheridge decided it was time to move on from the Tiverton League and joined the Devon and Exeter League, starting in Intermediate Four. The 1970s and 1980s at times were hard for Witheridge but the team kept plugging away and for a small village club managed to keep themselves going. Witheridge did have good times during this period but it wasn't until the 1990s that they started to make people in the Devon and Exeter League look up and take notice that the little village club was beginning to make a big stir.

In 1990 the side won the Express and Echo Shield and they soon started flying through the Devon and Exeter League. 1992 saw Witheridge promoted to Intermediate One then race through Senior Three, Two and One. Then in 1996 Witheridge won promotion to the Devon and Exeter Premier League.
In 1997 Andre Pike was appointed as first team manager and from that point on the club went from strength to strength. The 1999/2000 season saw Witheridge finish runners-up in the Devon and Exeter Premier League and also win three cups, the Okehampton Cup, Devon Premier Cup and the East Devon Senior Cup, all within two weeks of each other.

During their spell in the Devon and Exeter premier division, Witheridge became one of the big teams, finishing as runners-up four times in their last 7 seasons in the league. 2006 saw Withy finally promoted to the Devon County League and in their only season managed to finish 11th place, which saw Witheridge promoted into the newly formed South West Peninsula League Premier Division.

In the inaugural season of the South West Peninsula League, Witheridge managed a mid table finish despite being bottom of the league on Christmas Day which included a 12-match unbeaten run which stretched from February to the end of the season.

2009 saw the club take a massive step forward when levelling work was done to the pitch as well as the installation of floodlights at Edge Down Park which allowed the club to enter The FA Vase for the very first time.

During the summer of 2012, the club's changing rooms were completely renovated and a brand new 100-seat stand installed as well as a new pathway down to the stand.

Witheridge Football Club entered the FA Cup for the first time in the clubs 94-year history in August 2014 and won their inaugural match after beating Barnstaple Town 1–0 at Mill Road.

Ground

Witheridge play their home games at Edge Down Park, Fore Street, Witheridge, Tiverton, Devon, EX16 8AH.

Honours
Devon and Exeter League
Runner-up: 1999–2000, 2001–02, 2003–04, 2005–06

Devon & Exeter League Cup
Winners 1999–2000

East Devon Cup
Winners 1999–2000

Okehampton Cup
Winners 1999–2000, 2004–05

Westward Ho! Cup
Winners 2001–02

Rowe Charity Cup
Winners 2001–02, 2002–03, 2004–05

Season-by-season record since 2000

References

External links
Official website

Football clubs in Devon
Association football clubs established in 1920
1920 establishments in England
South West Peninsula League
Football clubs in England
Devon County League
Devon Football League